Reunion is the sixth studio album by Canadian folk music group The Rankin Family. It was released by Longview Music on January 16, 2007.

Track listing
"Departing Song" (Jimmy Rankin) – 3:32
"Nothing to Believe" (Heather Rankin) – 4:49
"Nothing Like an Ocean" (Jimmy Rankin, Gordie Sampson) – 3:28
"Sparrow" (Susan Crowe, Raylene Rankin) – 2:48
"Johnny Cope" (Traditional) – 4:07
"Sunday Morning" (David Francey) – 3:56
"The Way I Feel" (Gordon Lightfoot) – 4:02
"Our Time Is Tonight" (Jimmy Rankin) – 4:53
"Hush the Waves" (Traditional) – 2:08
"Hillsdale Medley" (John Morris Rankin) – 4:53
"Sunset" (Molly Rankin) – 4:37
"Gone" (John Hiatt) – 3:14

References

2007 albums
The Rankin Family albums
EMI Records albums
Albums produced by George Massenburg